"Running Up That Hill", titled "Running Up That Hill (A Deal with God)" on some releases, is a song by the British singer and songwriter Kate Bush. It was released in the United Kingdom as the lead single from Bush's album Hounds of Love on 5 August 1985 by EMI Records. The lyrics imagine a scenario in which a man and a woman make "a deal with God" to exchange places. Bush wrote and produced "Running Up That Hill" using a Fairlight CMI synthesiser and a LinnDrum drum machine.

Upon its original release, "Running Up That Hill" reached number three on the UK Singles Chart and number 30 on the Billboard Hot 100 in the United States, and was Bush's first US Top 40 hit. Bush first performed it live in 1987 at the Secret Policeman's Third Ball, accompanied by Pink Floyd guitarist David Gilmour; she did not perform it again until her 2014 Before the Dawn concerts. Other appearances were promotional lip synced television performances, which were common at the time.

In 2012, a remix of the song featuring newly recorded vocals premiered during that year's Summer Olympics closing ceremony, and entered the UK top 10 for one week, at number six. 

In 2022, "Running Up That Hill" received renewed attention when it was featured in the fourth season of the Netflix series Stranger Things. Its appearance led to the song's resurgence on charts around the world, topping the charts in eight countries, including the United Kingdom for three consecutive weeks, Ireland for seven consecutive weeks and Australia for nine non-consecutive weeks. The song also reached a new peak of number three on the Billboard Hot 100.

Writing and recording
"Running Up That Hill" was the first song Bush composed for her fifth album, Hounds of Love (1985). She wrote it in a single evening at her home, and recorded the first version with the engineer Del Palmer, using a Fairlight CMI synthesiser and a LinnDrum drum machine. The main riff was played on the Fairlight using its sampled cello sound. Bush, Palmer and the engineers Paul Hardiman and Haydn Bendall built upon this version to develop the final song, spending particular time on the Fairlight part.

Bush said the lyrics address the inability of men and women to understand each other. She imagined that by making "a deal with God", they could exchange places and reach a greater understanding. The song was originally titled "A Deal with God", but representatives at EMI Records feared this would make it unpopular in more religious countries. The album version of the song is listed as "Running Up That Hill (A Deal with God)".

Music video
The music video features Bush performing an interpretive dance with dancer Michael Hervieu. The video was directed by David Garfath while the dance routines were choreographed by Diane Grey. Bush and Hervieu are shown wearing grey Japanese hakamas. Bush wanted the dancing in "Running Up That Hill" to be more of a classical performance. She stated that dance in music videos was "being used quite trivially, it was being exploited: haphazard images, busy, lots of dances, without really the serious expression, and wonderful expression, that dance can give. So we felt how interesting it would be to make a very simple routine between two people, almost classic, and very simply filmed. So that's what we tried, really, to do a serious piece of dance."

The choreography draws upon contemporary dance with a repeated gesture suggestive of drawing a bow and arrow (the gesture was made literal on the cover for the single in which Bush poses with a real bow and arrow), intercut with surreal sequences of Bush and Hervieu searching through crowds of masked strangers. At the climax of the song, Bush's partner withdraws from her and the two are then swept away from each other and down a long hall in opposite directions by an endless stream of anonymous figures wearing masks made from pictures of Bush and Hervieu's faces. MTV chose not to show this video (at the time of its original release) and instead used a playback "live" performance of the song recorded at a promotional appearance on the BBC TV show Wogan. According to Paddy Bush, "MTV weren't particularly interested in broadcasting videos that didn't have synchronized lip movements in them. They liked the idea of people singing songs."

2012 remix

On 12 August 2012, Bush released a new version, "Running Up That Hill (A Deal with God)", via her Fish People label. Subtitled '2012 Remix', it uses the backing track of the extended version of the 1985 12-inch single, over which new lead vocals were recorded. The track was transposed down a semitone to fit Bush's current lower vocal range. The new version was premiered during the 2012 Summer Olympics closing ceremony. Bush did not appear herself, but the recording was featured in a section of the closing ceremony, after the entry of athletes and prior to the presentation of the medals for the Marathon. The track set the theme to a dance performance, where a 'hill' or pyramid was gradually assembled by the dancers from giant white blocks, representing each of the Olympic events. The performance was not shown in the United States NBC coverage due to time constraints and tape delay issues.

The track is included in the official soundtrack album of the 2012 Summer Olympics closing ceremony A Symphony of British Music: Music for the Closing Ceremony of the London 2012 Olympic Games. On 19 August the remix entered the UK charts at number 6. It was Bush's return to the top ten after nearly seven years, following "King of the Mountain" in 2005.

Impact and legacy

 In a retrospective review, AllMusic journalist Amy Hanson wrote: "Always adept at emotion and beautifully able to manipulate even the most bitter of hearts, rarely has Bush penned such a brutally truthful, painfully sensual song."
 In 1985 the song was ranked number 3 among the "Tracks of the Year" by NME.
 "Running Up That Hill" was used as the theme song for the 1986 BBC 1 children's drama serial Running Scared.
 The song was nominated for British Single of the Year at the 1986 Brit Awards.
 In 2018 it was featured in the pilot episode of the drama series Pose.
 In 2019, the song was featured in the ninth episode of the third season of the Netflix original series GLOW.
 In 2021 the song was listed at number 60 in [[Rolling Stone's 500 Greatest Songs of All Time|Rolling Stone'''s 500 Greatest Songs of All Time]].
 In 2022 the song was included in the list "The story of NME in 70 (mostly) seminal songs", at number 25.
 As of 16 June 2022 the single has sold 771,568 copies in the United Kingdom after 1994, with 165,762 of those sales in 2022.
 The song was nominated for Favorite Rock Song at the American Music Awards of 2022.

 Stranger Things and 2022 chart resurgence 
"Running Up That Hill" gained renewed attention in May 2022 after it was featured in the fourth season of the Netflix series Stranger Things, including as a key diegetic piece used during a dramatic scene, being an important element in the plot, and as a recurring fixture of the soundtrack. Bush had rarely allowed her songs to be licensed, but agreed because she was a fan of the show. Following the premiere, Spotify revealed streams for the song increased by 9,900% in the United States. 

On the UK Singles Chart dated 3 June 2022, the single re-entered the top 10 at number eight, reaching number two the following week. Chart analyst James Masterton of Chart Watch opined that "Running Up That Hill" could reach number one, but because it was an older song re-entering the chart, the Official Charts Company's accelerated chart ratio (ACR) rule meant that its 700,000 per day streams were halved when factored in for the chart and counted for less than the 400,000 streams per day for that week's number one, "As It Was" by Harry Styles. Bush's record label EMI made an official request to suspend the ACR rule for "Running Up That Hill" given the song's continued popularity and sales on streaming charts, which was enacted by the Chart Supervisory Committee over the weekend of 11 June 2022. "Running Up That Hill" reached number one on the UK Singles Chart dated 17 June 2022 and was Bush's first number one since "Wuthering Heights" in 1978. On 1 July 2022, the song charted at number one for a third week in Ireland and the United Kingdom. The song also reached number one in Australia, Belgium, Ireland, Lithuania, Luxembourg, New Zealand, Sweden, and Switzerland.

In the United States, "Running Up That Hill" re-entered the Billboard Hot 100 on the chart dated 11 June 2022 at number eight, an improvement on the single's initial 1985 peak of number 30 and also becoming Bush's highest charting single on the Hot 100 to date. The song reached number four the following week and has since peaked at number three. The song also charted on Billboard's rock charts, and peaked at number one on both Hot Alternative Songs and Hot Rock & Alternative Songs and debuted at number 26 on the Alternative Airplay chart, Bush's first entry on the latter chart since "Rubberband Girl" in January 1994.

An orchestral remix of the song that interpolated the series' main theme was used in a trailer for the second part of the fourth season, as well as in the season finale "Chapter Nine: The Piggyback".

On 1 September 2022, "Running Up That Hill" was issued as a CD single for the first time, with its original vinyl single artwork and B-side "Under the Ivy".

Track listing and formats

Personnel
 Kate Bush – vocals, Fairlight CMI
 Alan Murphy – guitar
 Del Palmer – bass guitar, LinnDrum programming
 Stuart Elliott – drums
 Paddy Bush – balalaika

Charts

Weekly charts

Year-end charts

Certifications

Notable cover versions and remixes

1990s–2000s
Trance and house music act Elastic Band's version reached number one on RPM's Canadian Dance Chart in September 1994.

Dutch symphonic metal band Within Temptation covered the song in 2003. The version debuted at number 9 on the Dutch charts on 17 May 2003. It peaked at number 7 a week later. This version of the song also managed to enter the charts in Austria, Belgium, Germany, and Switzerland.

In that same year, British alternative rock band Placebo covered the song as the first track of their Covers album. After being used for the fourth-season premiere of The O.C., the song received much attention in both the US and the UK, peaking at No. 44 on the UK Singles Chart.

In 2007, the American electronic band Chromatics released a dark, synth-wave cover of the song on their album Night Drive.

2010s–2020s
American alternative music artist Meg Myers released a cover of the song on 6 March 2019. Her version reached number one on both the Billboard Rock Airplay chart and the Alternative Songs chart in January 2020.

Italian techno producer and DJ Matteo Milleri from Tale of Us under his stage name Anyma released a version of "Running Up That Hill" simply titled "Running" on 8 December 2021, which is based on Myers' recording of the song.

In 2022, Astrid Jorgensen arranged "Running Up That Hill" for Pub Choir. The cover was praised by Kate Bush as "utterly, utterly wonderful!".

The German singer Kim Petras released a cover for Amazon Music's "Proud" playlist, made for Pride Month in June 2022. Her cover has been called more overtly 80s and less sultry than the Chromatics version. Petras’ version charted at #100 on the UK Singles chart. Petras officially released the cover on other streaming services on 2 September 2022, after the song reached 20 million streams on Amazon Music.

British indie rock band The Wombats covered the song on 23 June 2022 on Australian radio station Triple J's program Like a Version.

British singer Rita Ora included a cover of the song during her setlist at the Rock in Rio music festival in September 2022, mashing it up with her own hit "For You". The performance was met with scathing reviews from critics and the general public, some of which accused Ora of oversinging and missing the message behind the song entirely, only performing it because of its recent popularity from its use in the Netflix series Stranger Things''. Words used to describe the rendition include "dreadful", "ghastly", "deranged", "a massacre", "awful", "chaotic", and "disrespectful". Ora's vocal performance also drew comparisons to Fergie's infamously panned rendition of "The Star-Spangled Banner" at the 2018 NBA All-Star Game.

References

1985 songs
1985 singles
2003 singles
2012 singles
2022 singles
Kate Bush songs
Within Temptation songs
Kim Petras songs
Fiction about body swapping
Songs written by Kate Bush
British new wave songs
British synth-pop songs
EMI Records singles
Children's television theme songs
Number-one singles in Australia
Number-one singles in Belgium
Number-one singles in New Zealand
Number-one singles in Sweden
Number-one singles in Switzerland
Billboard Global 200 number-one singles
Billboard Global Excl. U.S. number-one singles
Irish Singles Chart number-one singles
UK Singles Chart number-one singles